Ricoh Caplio R3 is a digital camera marketed to the public under the Ricoh brand.

External links 
 Ricoh Caplio R3,  October 25, 2005
 CNet Review, November 2, 2005
 Ricoh Caplio R3 Review, December 13, 2005

Ricoh digital cameras